Eskişehir is a village in Tarsus district of Mersin Province, Turkey. It is situated in Çukurova (Cilicia of the antiquity). The population of village is 131 as of 2012. The main crop of the village is grapes.

References

Villages in Tarsus District